Centerville is an unincorporated community in northeast Leon County, Florida, United States.

Location
Centerville, while rural, encompasses part of a large housing development of Killearn Acres and also a few homes on Roberts Road, Centerville Road, and Bradfordville Road. Centerville's boundaries are not distinct but it is fair to say that Centerville is bordered on the north by Felkel.

Schools
Centerville is home to Roberts Elementary School

History

Civil War history
Soldiers from Centerville enlisted in Company K, 5th Florida Infantry. The following soldiers are interred at Old Pisgah Methodist Church Cemetery. None died during any battles.
 Pvt. Andrew Fraser Berry - Born November 1839. Previous resident of Thomasville, Georgia. More details
 2nd Lieutenant James B. Conner - Born January 22, 1840 in Leon County. More details
 Pvt. Wesley, R. Felkel - Born in 1837 in South Carolina. More details
 Pvt George Washington Jeffcoat - Born March 12, 1833 in Orangeburg County, South Carolina. More details
 Pvt. Irvin Watson Gramling - Born October 30, 1840. Farmer, Leon County. More details
 Pvt. Wilber Wightman Gramling - Born March 30, 1843 in Spartanburg, SC. Previously resident Thomasville, Georgia 
 Pvt. James F. Harley - Born April 30, 1862 in Centerville. More details
 2nd Sergeant William Thomas Snipes - Born on April 13, 1838. Previous resident of Thomasville, Georgia. More details

Political

References

External links
 Soldiers interred at Pisqah Methodist Church Cemetery

Unincorporated communities in Leon County, Florida
Tallahassee metropolitan area
History of Leon County, Florida
Unincorporated communities in Florida